A Centaur's Life, known in Japan as , is a Japanese slice of life comedy manga series by Kei Murayama. The series has been serialized in Tokuma Shoten's Monthly Comic Ryū magazine since February 2011, and is published in English by Seven Seas Entertainment. An anime television series adaptation by Haoliners Animation League aired in Japan from July to September 2017. The anime is licensed by Crunchyroll.

Plot
The series takes place in a world that took a different path of evolution from the world we know resulting in mythological creatures, such as centaurs, satyrs, mermaids, and demons, taking the place of humans in today's society. The story largely focuses around a centaur girl named Himeno Kimihara, as she goes about her daily life with her friends and family.

Characters
 
 
 A centaur girl with a gentle personality. She is at an age where she is anxious about the size of her chest and body. Is informally called "hime" (Japanese for "princess") by her friends.

 
 
 A demon girl who is a friend of Himeno and lives in a karate dojo. She has a rough personality and is often teased for her boyish appearance.

 
 
 A half-Satyress who is another friend of Himeno. She is cool and composed. She is just like her older brother.

 
 
 An angel girl. She naturally has the disposition of a committee chairman. She looks after her four younger sisters; her mother is not around and her father tries to find success as an artist.

 
 
 A ram-horned girl who has a cheeky personality. She is a lesbian who is in a relationship with Inukai, but enjoys teasing other girls too.

 
 
 An alicorn-horned girl and Mitsuyo's girlfriend.

 
 
 A perverted demon boy who lusts after Himeno.

 
 
 A shy angel boy and the assistant to Manami.

 
 
 A cat boy and friend to Komori.

 
 

 
 
 A foreign exchange student from Antarctica who resembles a snake. Since her race has a logical way of thinking, she feels like an alien within Japanese culture, but she is gentle, friendly and adaptable.

 
 
 Himeno's cousin who is in kindergarten. She loves Himeno very much.

 
 

   
 (Chigusa, Chinami, Chiho) 
 Mostly known as the Chi-chans-(ちち-ゃん) are Manami's identical triplet younger sisters and the older sisters of Sue. They each have light orange hair-(in different hairstyles) along with cat ears and a tail like their father. While their personalities are extremely similar, they can be told apart by their hairstyles; Chigusa has her hair kept in twin braids, Chinami has her hair up in a ponytail, and Chiho's hair is in a bob-cut.

 
 
 The youngest sister of the Mitama siblings. She is a rare mix of an angel and a cat, however she suffers from a strange disease that is associated with it; she has white hair just like her older sister and mother. Despite her weak and fragile appearance, she is always a happy and playful child. Unlike her older sisters she is quiet, sensitive, soft-spoken, and reserved. She refers to all of her sisters as "nē-nē" (ネネ).

 
 
 A friend and next-door neighbor of the youngest Mitama siblings. She has a six-legged dog named Yoshi.

 
 
 A friend and classmate of Shino from kindergarten.

 
 
 A friend and classmate of Shino from kindergarten.

Media

Manga
The original manga illustrated by Kei Murayama began serialization in Tokuma Shoten's Monthly Comic Ryū from February 2011. Twenty-one tankōbon volumes have been released as of October 13, 2021. The series moved to online-only serialization when Comic Ryū changed formats on June 19, 2018. The series is licensed in English by Seven Seas Entertainment, who began releasing it in North America from November 5, 2013.

Volume list

Anime
An anime adaptation was announced on the wraparound of the manga's 14th volume, released on December 13, 2016, later revealed to be a television series. It is animated by Haoliners Animation League and directed by Naoyuki Konno, with Fumitoshi Oizaki credited as the chief director and Touko Machida is the series composition. The character design is done by Sakae Shibuya, who is also a chief animation director. The twelve-episode series aired on Tokyo MX between July 9 and September 24, 2017. Crunchyroll has licensed the series, and Funimation dubbed it and released it on home video as part of the two companies' partnership.

Episode list

Reception
On Anime News Network, Rebecca Silverman gave volume 1 an overall grade of B−.

Notes

References

External links
 
 

2017 anime television series debuts
Anime series based on manga
Centaurs
Comedy anime and manga
Crunchyroll anime
Funimation
Haoliners Animation League
Japanese LGBT-related animated television series
LGBT speculative fiction television series
Manga adapted into television series
Seinen manga
Seven Seas Entertainment titles
Slice of life anime and manga
Supernatural anime and manga
Tokuma Shoten manga
Tokyo MX original programming